The Armagh River (in French: rivière Armagh) is a tributary of the Filkars River which flows on the south bank of the Beaurivage River whose current flows successively on the west bank of the Chaudière River and on the south shore of the St. Lawrence River. It flows in the municipality of Sainte-Agathe-de-Lotbinière, in the Lotbinière Regional County Municipality, in the administrative region of Chaudière-Appalaches, in Quebec, in Canada.

Geography 

The main neighboring watersheds of the River Armagh are:
 north side: rivière du Chêne, Henri River, Beaurivage River;
 east side: Beaurivage River, Chaudière River;
 south side: Bécancour River, Palmer River, Saint-André River;
 west side: Bécancour River.

From its source, the Armagh River flows on  divided into the following segments:
  north-east, to a country road;
  towards the northeast, up to its confluence.

Toponymy 
The toponym Rivière Armagh was formalized on October 16, 1983 at the Commission de toponymie du Québec.

See also 

 List of rivers of Quebec

Notes and references 

Rivers of Chaudière-Appalaches
Lotbinière Regional County Municipality